Welcome to the Ball is the fourth album by the American heavy metal band Vicious Rumors, released in 1991. It was produced by Michael Rosen and Geoff Thorpe.

The band supported the album with a North American tour. Welcome to the Ball was nominated for a Bammie Award.

Critical reception

The Chicago Tribune wrote: "By combining the best of two worlds—the anger and energy of thrash with the harmony and intricate guitar work of more commercial metal—Vicious Rumors sets itself apart from the scores of bands doing one or the other." The Washington Post noted that the band "takes its musical marching orders from such aging British headbangers as Judas Priest... Every once in a while, though, the Vicious ones sound like Kansas."

Track listing
All songs written by Carl Albert, Geoff Thorpe and Mark McGee, except where noted.
"Abandoned" - 4:15
"You Only Live Twice" - 3:38
"Savior from Anger" - 4:08
"Children" (Thorpe, Albert, Andre Pessis, McGee) - 4:56
"Dust to Dust" (McGee, Thorpe) - 4:20
"Raise Your Hands" (McGee, Thorpe) - 4:02
"Strange Behavior" (Thorpe, McGee) - 4:08
"Six Stepsisters" - 3:31 
"Mastermind" - 3:55
"When Love Comes Down" - 4:58
"Ends of the Earth" - 3:13

Personnel
 Carl Albert – lead and backing vocals
 Geoff Thorpe – guitars
 Mark McGee – guitars
 Dave Starr – bass
 Larry Howe – drums

References

Vicious Rumors albums
1991 albums
Atlantic Records albums